Rebolledo is a surname. Notable people with the surname include:

Luis Rebolledo de Palafox y Melci, 1st marqués de Lazán (1772–1843), Aragonese officer and general during the Spanish War of Independence
Bernardino de Rebolledo (1597–1676), Spanish poet, soldier and diplomat
Diego de Rebolledo (in office 1654–1659), colonial governor of Spanish Florida
Efrén Rebolledo (1877–1929), Mexican poet and diplomat
Ernesto Martens Rebolledo (born 1933), Mexican chemical engineer, Secretary of Energy during Vicente Fox's government
Jonathan Rebolledo (born 1991), Chilean footballer
Juan Williams Rebolledo (1825–1910), Chilean rear admiral, commander-in-chief of the Chilean navy at the start of the War of the Pacific
Julián Rebolledo, American actor and voice talent, known for playing Jake Morgendorffer on the MTV animated series Daria
Manuel Preciado Rebolledo (1957–2012), Spanish football defender and coach
Nelson Rebolledo (born 1985), Chilean football midfielder or defender
Pedro Rebolledo (born 1960), former professional tennis player from Chile
Pedro Rebolledo (composer) (1895–1963), Panamanian composer and sometime trumpeter
José Rebolledo de Palafox, 1st Duke of Saragossa (1780–1847), Spanish general who fought in the Peninsular War
Daniel Rebolledo Sepúlveda (1848–1908), Chilean military officer

See also
Rebolledo de la Torre, municipality located in the province of Burgos, Castile and León, Spain
Rebola (disambiguation)
Rebollo
Robledo (disambiguation)